Nasser Simforoosh (born 1947) is an Iranian scientist, physician, university lecturer and urologist.
He is the author of more than 200 articles in international journals and several books in English and Persian. He is currently a full Professor of Urology in the Shahid Beheshti University of Medical Sciences. He is currently full professor at the Department of Urology, Shahid Beheshti University, and Vice-president of International Urological Association. According to a google scholar report, Professor Simforoosh's research works have been referred to 1,494 times and 3169 citations.

Early life and education
Simforoosh was born in Tehran, Iran, in 1947. He received his medical degree from the University of Tehran in Iran (1972), and he went to America to study urology after three years in 1980. No information is available regarding the institution where his residency training. He doesnt have any type of US medical board

Present duties
 Establisher and president of Urology Ward of Labbafi Nejad Medical Center, Shahid Beheshti University of Medical sciences
 Establisher and president of kidney transplant Ward in Labbafi Nejad Medical Center
 Member of the Research Center of Urology, Shahid Beheshti University
 Member of the National Board of Urology

Awards
Simforoosh is a recipient of Knowledge Gold Medal “National” in 2004. 
He is elected as the research man in Razi Festival (2006) and also he is elected  as Professor of the year of Iran in 1998.
Simforoosh is a recipient of the Best laparoscopic paper of year 2004 in 22nd World Congress of Endourology and SWL.

References

Iranian expatriate academics
Iranian nephrologists
20th-century Iranian inventors
Physicians from Tehran
1947 births
Living people